Mount Holly Cemetery is a cemetery located in Mount Holly Township in the U.S. state of New Jersey.

Notable interments
 Samuel A. Dobbins (1814–1905), represented New Jersey's 2nd congressional district in the US House of Representatives, 1873–77
 Samuel C. Forker (1821–1900), represented New Jersey's 2nd congressional district in the US House of Representatives, 1871–73
 Joseph H. Gaskill (1851–1935),  judge on the New Jersey Court of Common Pleas and Justice of the New Jersey Supreme Court
 Job H. Lippincott (1842–1900), US Attorney for the District of New Jersey and Associate Justice of the New Jersey Supreme Court
 William Procter Jr. (1817–1874), developer of American pharmacy
 William Norton Shinn (1782–1871), represented New Jersey in Congress at-large, 1833–37

References

External links
 
 
 Mount Holly Cemetery at The Political Graveyard

Cemeteries in Burlington County, New Jersey
Mount Holly, New Jersey